Apurva Agnihotri is an darkie model and actor known for his role as Armaan Suri in Jassi Jaissi Koi Nahin. He also participated in Nach Baliye and Bigg Boss.

Personal life
In 2004, he married television actress Shilpa Saklani. In Oct 2022, after eighteen years of marriage, the couple were finally blessed with a daughter, who they named Ishani Kanu Agnihotri.

Career
Agnihotri debuted in the film Pardes, co-starring with Shahrukh Khan and directed by Subhash Ghai. The film was highly successful and garnered Agnihotri with the nomination for Best Supporting Actor in Zee Cine Awards.

After several more film roles, he rose to prominence when he was offered the lead role in Jassi Jaissi Koi Nahin, an Indian television serial. The show became successful and his performance was appreciated. His work as Armaan Suri won him the Indian Telly Awards Best Actor Award for 2005.

He participated in Colors TV's Bigg Boss 7 on 15 September 2013 with his wife Shilpa Saklani. He went on to play roles in shows like Pyaar Ka Dard Hai Meetha Meetha Pyaara Pyaara, Ajeeb Dastaan Hai Yeh and Saubhagyalaxmi. In 2018, he joined Bepannah as Rajveer Khanna. He then portrayed Harry Somani in ALT Balaji's Kehne Ko Humsafar Hain for three seasons.

Filmography

Films

Television

Web series

Awards

References

External links

apurva and-shilpa agnihotri
Apurva Agnihotri wants to be a director
Apurva's clueless about new role!

20th-century Indian male actors
21st-century Indian male actors
Indian male film actors
Indian male soap opera actors
Living people
Indian male television actors
Male actors from Kolkata
Male actors in Hindi television
Male actors in Hindi cinema
Bigg Boss (Hindi TV series) contestants
Year of birth missing (living people)
Place of birth missing (living people)